Legitimate use of force may refer to:

 the right of a state to exercise legitimate authority or violence over a given territory; see monopoly on the legitimate use of physical force
 the right of civilians acting on their own behalf to engage in violence for the sake of self-defense; see right of self-defense